The desert climate or arid climate (in the Köppen climate classification BWh and BWk), is a dry climate sub-type in which there is a severe excess of evaporation over precipitation. The typically bald, rocky, or sandy surfaces in desert climates are dry and hold little moisture, quickly evaporating the already little rainfall they receive. Covering 14.2% of earth's land area, hot deserts are the second most common type of climate on earth after the polar climate.

There are two variations of a desert climate according to the Köppen climate classification: a hot desert climate (BWh), and a cold desert climate (BWk).

Precipitation
Although no part of Earth is known for certain to be absolutely rainless ever, in the Atacama Desert of northern Chile, the average annual rainfall over a period of 17 years was only just . Some locations in the Sahara Desert such as Kufra, Libya record an even drier  of rainfall annually. The official weather station in Death Valley, United States reports  annually, but in a 40-month period between 1931 and 1934 a total of just  of rainfall was measured.

To determine whether a location has an arid climate, the precipitation threshold is determined. The precipitation threshold (in millimetres) involves first multiplying the average annual temperature in °C by 20, then adding 280 if 70% or more of the total precipitation is in the high-sun summer half of the year (April through September in the Northern Hemisphere, or October through March in the Southern), or 140 if 30–70% of the total precipitation is received during the applicable period, or 0 if less than 30% of the total precipitation is so received there. If the area's annual precipitation is less than half the threshold (50%), it is classified as a BW (desert climate), while 50-100% the threshold results in a semi-arid climate.

Hot desert climates

Hot desert climates (BWh) are typically found under the subtropical ridge in the lower middle latitudes or the subtropics, often between 20° and 33° north and south latitudes. In these locations, stable descending air and high pressure aloft clear clouds and create hot, arid conditions with intense sunshine. Hot desert climates are found across vast areas of North Africa, Western Asia, northwestern parts of the Indian Subcontinent, interior Australia, the Southwestern United States, northern Mexico, the coast of Peru, and Chile. This makes hot deserts present in every continent except two: Antarctica and Europe.

At the time of high sun (summer), scorching, desiccating heat prevails. Some desert in the tropics consistently experience very high temperatures all year long, even during wintertime. This last feature is seen in sections of Africa and Arabia. During colder periods of the year, night-time temperatures can drop to freezing or below due to the exceptional radiation loss under the clear skies. However, very rarely do temperatures drop far below freezing under the hot subtype.

Hot desert climates can be found in the deserts of North Africa such as the wide Sahara Desert, the Libyan Desert or the Nubian Desert; deserts of the Horn of Africa such as the Danakil Desert or the Grand Bara Desert; deserts of Southern Africa such as the Namib Desert or the Kalahari Desert; deserts of Western Asia such as the Arabian Desert, the Syrian Desert or the Dasht-e Lut; deserts of South Asia such as Dasht-e Kavir or the Thar Desert of India and Pakistan; deserts of the United States and Mexico such as the Mojave Desert, the Sonoran Desert or the Chihuahuan Desert; deserts of Australia such as the Simpson Desert or the Great Victoria Desert and many other regions.

Hot deserts are lands of extremes: most of them are among the hottest, the driest and the sunniest places on Earth because of nearly constant high pressure; the nearly permanent removal of low-pressure systems, dynamic fronts and atmospheric disturbances; sinking air motion; dry atmosphere near the surface and aloft; the exacerbated exposure to the sun where solar angles are always high makes this desert inhospitable to most species.

Cold desert climates

Cold desert climates (BWk) usually feature hot (or warm in a few instances), dry summers, though summers are not typically as hot as hot desert climates. Unlike hot desert climates, cold desert climates tend to feature cold, dry winters. Snow tends to be rare and sporadic in regions with this climate. The Gobi Desert in northern China and Mongolia is one example of cold deserts. Though hot in the summer, it shares the very cold winters of the rest of Inner Asia. Cold desert climates are typically found at higher altitudes than hot desert climates and are usually drier than hot desert climates.

Cold desert climates are typically located in temperate zones, usually in the leeward rain shadow of high mountains, which restricts precipitation from the westerly winds. An example of this is the Patagonian Desert in Argentina bounded by the Andes ranges to its west. In the case of Central Asia, mountains restrict precipitation from the eastern monsoon.  The Kyzyl Kum, Taklamakan and Katpana Desert deserts of Central Asia are other major examples of BWk climates. The Ladakh region, and the city of Leh in the Great Himalayas in India also have a cold desert climate. In North America the cold desert climate occurs in the drier parts of the Great Basin Desert and in the Bighorn Basin in Big Horn and Washakie Counties in Wyoming. The Hautes Plaines, located in the northeastern section of Morocco and in Algeria is another major example of a cold desert climate. The Absheron Peninsula in eastern Azerbaijan is also an example of a cold desert climate.

Arctic and Antarctic regions also receive very little precipitation during the year, owing to the exceptionally cold dry air freezing most precipitation ; however, both of them are generally classified as having polar climates because they have average summer temperatures below  even if they have such desert-like features as intermittent streams, hypersaline lakes, and extremely barren terrain in unglaciated areas such as the McMurdo Dry Valleys of Antarctica.

See also 
 List of deserts
 Dry climate
 Semi-arid
 Desert

References

External links 

 Desert climate summary 
 Desert climate explanation
 Desert report/essay

Climate of Africa
Climate of Asia
Climate of Australia
Climate of North America
Climate of South America
climate
+Climate
Köppen climate types